The railway station of the town of Genk, Limburg, Belgium opened on 3 March 1874 and is on line 21D. The station was closed on 6 October 1941 and reopened on 26 May 1979. The train services are operated by National Railway Company of Belgium (NMBS).

Train services
The station is served by the following services:

Intercity services (IC-03) Blankeberge/Knokke - Bruges - Ghent - Brussels - Leuven - Hasselt - Genk

 These are complemented by a few peak-hour trains to Hasselt, and beyond to Brussels, departing in the early morning and returning in late afternoon.

See also
 List of railway stations in Belgium

References

External links
 
 Genk railway station at Belgian Railways website

Railway stations in Belgium
Railway stations opened in 1874
Railway stations in Limburg (Belgium)
Genk